That Funny Feeling is a 1965 American romantic comedy film directed by Richard Thorpe and starring Sandra Dee, Bobby Darin, and Donald O'Connor.

This was the third film pairing of Dee and then-husband Darin, following 1961's Come September and 1962's If a Man Answers. It was the second film that O'Connor and Kathleen Freeman (who played a lady waiting to use a  telephone booth) made together, the first being Singin' in the Rain.

Plot
Joan Howell intends to be an actress, but for now she's working as a maid.

On three different occasions, she and Tom Milford - a successful publishing executive, and womanizer - accidentally bump into each other. The third time, Tom asks her for a date.

Ashamed of her own modest home, which she shares with her aspiring-actress friend Audrey, Joan invites him to the lavish apartment of one of her clients - whom she believes is out of town for a couple of weeks - pretending it's hers. What she doesn't know, because she and her employer have never met, is that the apartment is Tom's.

He's shocked to find himself being welcomed to his own place. To see how far Joan's prepared to go, Tom moves in with his pal Harvey - who has his own concerns about Joan to do with his acrimonious divorce and property he's 'hiding' from his wife at Tom's place - and goes along with her ruse. As soon as Joan becomes aware of the truth, however, she gets even by inviting all Tom's previous conquests, dressed as prostitutes, to a party which the cops promptly raid.

In the police van on the way to the station, Tom proposes to Joan and Audrey flirts with a receptive Harvey.

Cast
Sandra Dee as Joan Howell
Bobby Darin as Tom Milford
Donald O'Connor as Harvey Granson
Nita Talbot as Audrey
Larry Storch as Luther
Leo G. Carroll as Mr. O'Shee, Pawnbroker
James Westerfield as Office Brokaw
Robert Strauss as Bartender
Ben Lessy as Charlie the Bartender
Reta Shaw, Nora Marlowe, Kathleen Freeman, and Minerva Urecal as the women at phone booth
Arte Johnson as Paul
Benny Rubin as Taxi Driver
Aki Hara as Hatacki
Don Haggerty as Policeman
Larry J. Blake as Policeman (as Larry Blake)
Herb Vigran as Taxi Driver (uncredited)
Smoki Whitfield as Police Sergeant (as Jordan Whitfield) (uncredited)

Home media availability
Universal first released the film on DVD on August 3, 2004. It was re-released on February 7, 2017, as part of Universal's 4-Movie Laugh Pack DVD series, being packaged with 3 other films starring Sandra Dee (If a Man Answers, Tammy Tell Me True, and Tammy and the Doctor).

See also
List of American films of 1965

References

External links
 

1965 films
1965 romantic comedy films
American romantic comedy films
1960s English-language films
Films directed by Richard Thorpe
Films set in New York City
Universal Pictures films
1960s American films